Robert Taylor Thorp (March 12, 1850 – November 26, 1938) was a U.S. Representative from Virginia.

Biography
Born near Oxford, North Carolina, Thorp attended Horner Academy, Oxford, North Carolina, and was graduated from the law department of the University of Virginia at Charlottesville in 1870.
He was admitted to the bar in 1870 and commenced practice in Boydton, Virginia, in 1871.
Commonwealth attorney for that county 1877-1895.
He successfully contested as a Republican the election of William R. McKenney to the Fifty-fourth Congress and served from May 2, 1896, to March 3, 1897.
He successfully contested the election of Sydney P. Epes to the Fifty-fifth Congress and served from March 23, 1898, to March 4, 1899.
He was an unsuccessful candidate for reelection in 1898 to the Fifty-sixth Congress.
He moved to Norfolk, Virginia, and continued the practice of law.
He moved to Virginia Beach, Virginia, in 1934 and died November 26, 1938.
He was interred in Forest Lawn Cemetery, Norfolk, Virginia.

Sources

1850 births
1938 deaths
Virginia lawyers
People from Oxford, North Carolina
People from Boydton, Virginia
University of Virginia School of Law alumni
Republican Party members of the United States House of Representatives from Virginia
Burials in Virginia